San Francisco de Macorís is a city in the Dominican Republic located in the northeast portion of the island, in the Cibao region. It is the capital of the Duarte Province, and the sixth most populated city in the country. The name San Francisco de Macorís comes from a combination of the name of Saint Francis, patron saint of the Franciscan Order (a religious organization from Italy that had come to this territory during colonization) and the territory's old name, which is Macorix.

The city is known as the Land of Cacao ("Tierra del Cacao"). It the location of the area in the world where the greatest amount of organic cocoa is produced, which in turn makes the Dominican Republic the biggest producer and exporter nation of this product. It also makes the Dominican Republic the 10th biggest producer of chocolate cacao beans in the world

History
The city founded near San Francisco de Macorís was founded in 1497. After the Vega was founded, Cotuí was later established in 1505 in a place rich in gold. For centuries what is now San Francisco de Macorís and the Duarte Province was rural outskirts of La Vega and Cotuí respectively. By the beginning of the 18th century, foreign investment from Europeans created a market for the production of cocoa, allowing the locals to gain a new source of income apart from livestock. It was the cocoa market that allowed the community around the Santa Ana monastery to become San Francisco de Macorís. However, it wasn't until the 1760s that the province gained a monopoly on the cocoa industry or managing to become a town for European travelers to stop by.

The Villa of Santa Ana of San Francisco de Macorís also previously called Hato Grande, was named this until it was owned by Francisco Ravelo Polanco, Provincial Mayor of the Santa Hermandad of Santiago de los Caballeros, and later the tradition points out to Juan de Alvarado and the families Tejada and De Jesus as the owners of the land and donors of the territorial area for the purpose of its foundation in 1778.

In 1795, the Treaty of Basel  was ratified, ceding to France the Spanish territory of Hispaniola. France took over the Spanish side in 1801, and under its administration San Francisco de Macorís is conceived became a parish with self-government. The official minutes of the city date back to 1811.

On October 2, 1896, Ulises Heureaux reorganized the city of San Francisco de Macorís under Provincial District "Pacificador" (Peacemaker). At that time it was assigned as common to Cantonal Position of Matanzas, Section Monte Abajo, Villa Riva, Canton Castillo, among others.

District Pacificador's name lasted until July 26, 1926, when the Dominican Congress changed its name to Duarte Province, presently used.

On 20 May 1963 the city council approved the renaming of the main streets of San Francisco de Macorís at the request of the Foundation Heroes of Constanza, Maimon and Estero Hondo.

Geography 

The city of San Francisco de Macorís is located in the North Region of the Dominican Republic (Cibao Region) between the Septentrional Mountain Range at the north and the Cibao Valley at the southern part. San Francisco de Macorís has hills to the north which provide a great view of the city during evening hours.  The Jaya River is prominent on the western part of town.

Relief 
This name allegedly comes from the time when the Spaniards were exploring the island, since the hill was too steep to ride their horses, they had to dismount and remove their spurs and undertake the ascent on foot. There are two main geologic regions: the north slope of the Cordillera Septentrional and the rough topography of the Delta del Yuna.

On the southern slope of the Cibao Valley in the Yuna Subregion (Easter Cibao), we will find alluvial fans, in combination with deposit hollows, hill areas and platforms, and also alluvial soils into the channels of the flows of the rivers Camú and Yuna.

Two faults go through the Duarte Province from east to west. This tectonic deformations are the Septentrional fault, that touches the towns of Arenoso, Castillo and San Francisco de Macorís and the Cibao fault passing through the towns of Las Guaranas, Castillo, Villa Riva Pimentel. The Septentrional fault is located in the northern part of the province while the Cibao fault is located in the southern part of it.

Geomorphology 
Yuna River Delta.
It is part of the Cibao Valley, and most of these areas are located a few metres above sea level and therefore wetlands abound. Its main rivers are the Great Yuna and Caño Estero, which is the natural drainage of these lands in the province of Maria Trinidad Sanchez. Consists mainly of swamps with silt and clay, are also large areas of peat deposits. By the rivers are alluvial.

Eastern Cibao Valley (Also part of the Cibao Valle).
It is divided into the provinces of Santiago, Espaillat, Sánchez Ramírez, Sánchez and Duarte, the latter having a higher percentage (about 50%). All cities in this province are rooted in this valley except the city of Arenoso. The floodplains of the Yuna River system occupy a narrow strip on the south side of the valley and there is also a narrow chain of hills probably middle Miocene limestones adjacent to the North mountain range. For this province the valley also has marine lacustrine deposits of clay, basically of two kinds: a limestone and other no calcareous.

The Haitises.
They consist of a karst platform, which is composed of hard limestone from the Oligocene-Miocene. The highest elevations are generally tall. The Payabo River crosses the region by a narrow channel filled with alluvial deposits.

Northern Range.
It is a mountain range of sedimentary rocks and highly faulted and folded fobáceas. It presents some mudstone, limestone and Miocene and Eocene oligocénicos. To the south of Gaspar Hernandez and reaching the Nagua River there is a very complex area with rugged hills of limestone, tuff and probably with other volcanic and metamorphic rocks, mainly of Upper Cretaceous.

Hydrography 
There are many rivers and streams in the Duarte Province, being the most important ones: the Camú River, the Yuna River and their tributaries (Jaya, Cuaba, Nigua, Payabo, among others). The Yuna River and Camú  River constitute important sources of water, both for drinking as irrigation.

Physiography and environment 
Environmental pollution in Duarte Province is the product of several elements such as the poor state of the latrines, untreated sewage, overflow of streams, indiscriminate use of agrochemicals, backwaters and installation of pigsties on the banks of rivers, as well as litter and some factories in the province that are thrown into rivers.

Soil erosion from deforestation also affects the environment of the Duarte Province. Similarly, the smoke from factories and from burning trash, specifically in the municipality of San Francisco de Macoris, is affecting its inhabitants

Climate
It is largely an isolated paradise since much of the territory is unaffected by hurricanes or extremely hot weather. Occasional floods can occur due to a rainy season which manifests itself mostly during the month of May.

Places of interest
Estadio Julian Javier
Casa del Morris Quezada
Parque Duarte
Catedral de Santa ana

The municipal building 

The City Hall of San Francisco de Macoris, is the headquarters of the city council and city mayor.

Santa Ana Cathedral 

This structure is a mixture of Gothic and modern architecture.  It covers a complete city block, bound in the north by Santa Ana Street, in the south by Colon Street, on the west by Papi Olivier Street and on the east by Restauracion Street.  The Santa Ana Cathedral is the headquarters of Obispo de la Diócesis de San Francisco and home to the humanist Monseñor Jesús María de Jesús Moya.

Communications 

San Francisco de Macoris, has several radio stations and publications. Its longest running newspaper is ''El Jaya'', which was founded on November 20, 1985. Its director and founder is the journalist Adriano Cruz Marte.

Notable residents
José Rafael Molina Ureña: 44th President of the Republic, 1965
Francisco Garcia: NBA Basketball Player for the Sacramento Kings
Julián Javier: Baseball Player
Stan Javier: Baseball Player
Eladio Romero Santos Music Producer and Singer
Marino Vinicio Castillo: lawyer
Hilma Contreras: Writer
Jackeline Estevez: Singer
Victor Martinez: Professional Bodybuilder
Don Miguelo: singer and writer 
Richard Ureña: Baseball Player
Hanser Alberto: Professional Baseball Player for the Kansas City Royals
Luis Kalaf: Composer, musician.
Elio Rojas: World champion boxer
Joel Almonó, Priest , director of the Grace Episcopal Church in Lawrence, Massachusetts.

References

External links
 

 
Populated places in Duarte Province
Municipalities of the Dominican Republic
Populated places established in the 1490s